Henryk Szaro (1900 – 1942) was a Polish screenwriter and film director. He was born Henoch Szapiro, of Jewish background. He became a leading Polish director of the late 1920 and 1930s. Szaro was killed in the Warsaw Ghetto in 1942 during the German Occupation of Poland in the Second World War.

Selected filmography

Director
 Exile to Siberia (1930)
 Pan Twardowski (1936)
 Ordynat Michorowski (1937)
 The Vow (1937)
 Three Troublemakers (1937)

References

Bibliography
 Haltof, Marek. Polish Film and the Holocaust: Politics and Memory. Berghahn Books, 2012.
 Skaff, Sheila. The Law of the Looking Glass: Cinema in Poland, 1896-1939. Ohio University Press, 2008.

External links

1900 births
1942 deaths
People who died in the Warsaw Ghetto
Polish film directors
Film people from Warsaw
People from Warsaw Governorate
Jews from the Russian Empire
20th-century Polish screenwriters
Male screenwriters
20th-century Polish male writers